The Parks-Reagan House is a historic house at 420 West Poplar Street in Rogers, Arkansas.  Built in 1898, this two-story Colonial Revival house is one of the finest and oldest in Rogers.  It is a wood-frame structure, roughly square in shape, with a pyramidal roof and a forward-projecting gable-roof section.  A single-story porch wraps around the front and side of the house, with a gable-pedimented section marking the entry stairs.  The house was built for George Parks, a local merchant, and has since 1923 been owned by the Reagan family.

The house was listed on the National Register of Historic Places in 1988.

See also
National Register of Historic Places listings in Benton County, Arkansas

References

Houses on the National Register of Historic Places in Arkansas
Colonial Revival architecture in Arkansas
Houses completed in 1898
Houses in Rogers, Arkansas
National Register of Historic Places in Benton County, Arkansas